Sophronius III served as Greek Patriarch of Alexandria between 1116 and 1171.

References

12th-century Patriarchs of Alexandria
Melkites in the Fatimid Caliphate